The 3rd Pan American Acrobatic Gymnastics Championships were held in Monterrey, Mexico from November 22 to 24, 2019. The competition was organized by the Mexican Gymnastics Federation and approved by the International Gymnastics Federation.

Participating nations
  (Junior and age groups)
  (Junior and age groups)
  (Age groups)
  (Age groups)
  (Senior, junior and age groups)

Results

Senior

Junior and age groups

References

2019 in gymnastics
Pan American Gymnastics Championships
International gymnastics competitions hosted by Mexico
2019 in Mexican sports